Āpua was an ancient village in the Puna district on the southern coast of the Island of Hawaii in the Hawaiian Islands.
The village was destroyed by a tsunami following the April 2, 1868 Hawaii earthquake and never resettled.

Āpua Point, just south of the former village site,  has a backcountry campground for Hawaii Volcanoes National Park. There is no drinking water nor other facilities at the site. Weather and surf conditions can be very dangerous. The trail crosses both old and new lava flows from the active volcano.

References

Destroyed towns
Ghost towns in Hawaii
Landforms of Hawaii (island)
Populated places on Hawaii (island)